Frederick III may refer to:
 Frederick III, Duke of Upper Lorraine (died 1033)
 Frederick III, Duke of Swabia (1122–1190)
 Friedrich III, Burgrave of Nuremberg (1220–1297)
 Frederick III, Duke of Lorraine (1240–1302)
 Frederick III of Sicily (1272–1337), also known as Frederick II of Sicily
 Frederick III of Germany (1289–1330), nicknamed the Fair, King of the Romans and previously Duke Frederick I of Austria
 Frederick III, Margrave of Baden-Baden (1327–1353)
 Frederick III, Landgrave of Thuringia (1332–1381)
 Frederick III, Margrave of Meissen (1332–1381)
 Frederick III the Simple (1341–1377), King of Sicily
 Frederick III, Duke of Austria (1347–1362)
 Frederick III, Count of Moers (1354–1417)
 Frederick III, Count of Veldenz (died 1444)
 Frederick III, Holy Roman Emperor (1415–1493)
 Frederick III, Duke of Brunswick-Lüneburg (1424–1495)
 Frederick III, Elector of Saxony (aka Frederick the Wise,)  (1463–1525)
 Frederick III, Elector Palatine (1515–1576)
 Frederick III, Duke of Legnica (1520–1570)
 Frederick III, Duke of Holstein-Gottorp (1597–1659)
 Frederick III of Denmark (1609–1670)
 Frederick III, Margrave of Brandenburg-Ansbach (1616–1634)
 Frederick III of Brandenburg (1657–1713), also Frederick I of Prussia, Elector of Brandenburg
 Frederick III, Landgrave of Hesse-Homburg (1673–1746)
 Frederick III, Duke of Saxe-Gotha-Altenburg (1699–1772)
 Frederick Philipse III (1720–1786)
 Frederick III, Fuerst of Salm-Kyrburg (1744–1794)
 Friedrich III, Landgrave of Hesse-Cassel (1747–1837)
 Frederick III, Duke of Wurttemberg (1754–1816)
 Frederick III, German Emperor (1831–1888)

See also
 Emperor Frederick III (disambiguation)